The Williamstown Literary Festival is a two-day literary festival that takes place in the Town Hall and Library in Williamstown, Victoria, Australia. It features more than 80 authors participating in 50 events and is run by a volunteer committee of locals, supplemented by more than 30 volunteers at festival time.

The idea of the festival was developed over a coffee in 2003 in a Williamstown cafe by co-founders Angela Altair and Catherine Ryan.

There is a strong focus on local participation, with four Ada Cambridge writing prizes for people who live, work or study in the western suburbs, and the People's Choice Awards, showcasing aspiring local writers and poets. There are links with local secondary schools, involving students in the Willy Lit Fest Debate, and the newly implemented Young Adas competitions for 14 to 18 year olds.

References

External links 
Williamstown Literary Festival

Literary festivals in Australia
Festivals in Melbourne
Recurring events established in 2003
2003 establishments in Australia
Williamstown, Victoria